Tatiana Yurievna Sotnikova (born 20 January 1981 in Moscow, Russian SFSR, Soviet Union) is a Russian ice hockey forward.

International career
Sotnikova was selected for the Russia national women's ice hockey team in the 2002, 2006 and 2010 Winter Olympics. In 2002, she did not score a point in five games. In 2006, she had one assist in five games, and in 2010 she had one goal in five games. She also played in the qualifying tournament for the 2006 Olympics.

Sotnikova has also appeared for Russia at six IIHF Women's World Championships. Her first appearance came in 1999. She was a part of the bronze medal winning team at the 2001 IIHF Women's World Championship.

Career statistics

International career

References

External links
Eurohockey.com Profile
Sports-Reference Profile

1981 births
Living people
Ice hockey players at the 2002 Winter Olympics
Ice hockey players at the 2006 Winter Olympics
Ice hockey players at the 2010 Winter Olympics
Olympic ice hockey players of Russia
Ice hockey people from Moscow
Russian women's ice hockey forwards